Elvira is an unincorporated community in Clinton County, Iowa, United States.  It falls within the Clinton zip code (52732).

History
Elvira was platted in 1854. It was named by W. H. Gibbs, the owner of the town site, in honor of his wife. Elvira's population was 31 in 1902, and 37 in 1925.

References

Unincorporated communities in Clinton County, Iowa
Unincorporated communities in Iowa
1854 establishments in Iowa
Populated places established in 1854